Gegeen Lake, also known as Gegeen Nuur ("holy lake", is a lake in Mongolia. The lake lays within the Khangai Mountains and feeds the Zavkhan River. Taishir Hydro Power Station lays at the head of the lake; the station and accompanying dam greatly add to the size of the lake.

See also 
 List of lakes of Mongolia

References 

Lakes of Mongolia